is a subway station on the Sapporo Municipal Subway in Toyohira-ku, Sapporo, Hokkaido, Japan, operated by the Sapporo Municipal Subway. The station is numbered N12.

Platforms

Surrounding area
 Japan National Route 453 (to Date)
 Toyohira Ward Hiragishi Community Center
 Sapporo Hiragishi Community Center
 KKR Sapporo Medical Center, Hospital
 Hiragishi Sanjo Post Office
 Hiragishi Toyohira Police Station
 Sapporo City Agricultural Cooperative Association (JA Sapporo), Hiragishi branch

External links

 Sapporo Subway Stations

 

Railway stations in Japan opened in 1971
Railway stations in Sapporo
Sapporo Municipal Subway
Toyohira-ku, Sapporo

zh:南平岸車站